Stanford is an unincorporated community in Latah County, in the U.S. state of Idaho.

The community was probably named for Inman A. Stanford, an early settler.

References

Unincorporated communities in Latah County, Idaho
Unincorporated communities in Idaho